Religion in Benin is characterized by diversity and pluralism, with no particular religion constituting an absolute majority of the population. Christianity is the most widely professed religion, and substantial populations of Muslims and adherents of Traditional Faiths are also present in the country. According to the most recent 2013 census, the population of Benin is 27.7% Muslim, 25.5% Roman Catholic, 13.5% Protestant (which includes Celestial 6.7%, Methodist 3.4%, and other Protestant 3.4%), 11.6% Vodun, 9.5% of other Christian denominations, and 12.2% of others or none.

There are Christians, Muslims, and adherents of African Traditional Religion throughout the country. However, most adherents of the traditional Yoruba religious group are in the south, while other African Traditional Religion beliefs are followed in the north. Muslims are represented most heavily in the north and southeast. Christians are prevalent in the south, particularly in Cotonou, the economic capital. It is not unusual for members of the same family to practise Christianity, Islam, African Traditional Religion, or a combination of all of these.

Faiths

African Traditional Religion
Among the most practised African Traditional Religions in Benin is the Vodun system of belief which originated in this area of Africa.

Other African Traditional Religions are practiced in the Atakora (Atakora and Donga provinces) and Vodun and Orisha or Orisa veneration among the Yoruba and Tado peoples is prevalent in the centre and south of the country. The town of Ouidah on the central coast is the spiritual centre of Beninese Vodun.

The Tado and the Yoruba Orisha pantheons correspond closely:
 The supreme deity Mawu (in the Fon language) or Olodumare (also known as Olorun, Eledumare, Olofin-Orun and Eledaa among other names)(in Yoruba)
 The deity of the earth and smallpox, known as Sakpana (or Sopono, Sakpata), can also be spelt as 'Shakpata, Shopono, Shakpana, and also known as Babalu Aye or Obalu Aye.
 The deity of thunder and lightning, known as Shango; can also be spelt as Sango, also known as Jakuta, Chango, Xevioso and Hevioso.
 The deity of war and iron, known as Ogun, also known as Ogoun or Gu.

Christianity
  
Christianity first reached Benin in 1680, gaining more permanent footing in the 19th century. English Methodists arrived in 1843, operating amongst the coastal Gun people. French missionaries spread Catholicism in the region. More than half of all Christians in Benin are Roman Catholic. The Catholic hierarchy in Benin consists of the Archdiocese of Cotonou (including the Dioceses of Abomey, Dassa-Zoumé, Lokossa, Porto Novo) and the Parakou (including the Dioceses of Djougou, Kandi, Natitingou, and N'Dali). There are 440 priests and 900 men and women in religious orders. Other Christian groups include Baptists, Methodists, Assemblies of God, Pentecostals, Seventh-day Adventists, the Church of Jesus Christ of Latter-day Saints (Mormons), Jehovah's Witnesses, Celestial Christians, Rosicrucians, the Unification Church. Many nominal Christians also practise traditional local religious beliefs.

Islam

Islam, which accounts for more than 27% of the country's population, was brought to Benin from the north by Hausa, and Songhai-Dendi traders. Nearly all Muslims adhere to the Sunni Maliki branch of Islam. The few Shi'a Muslims are primarily Middle Eastern expatriates. Shia population in Benin is estimated between one and twelve percent of the total Muslim population of Benin, according to Pew Forum it is less than one percent while as per Ahl al-Bayt World Assembly the population of Shia in Benin is around twelve percent of the total Muslim population of Benin. Ahmadiyya Muslim Community is also present, who recently inaugurated a mosque in Benin, the Al Mahdi Mosque in 2006. Many nominal Muslims also practise traditional local religious beliefs.

Three out of twelve departments have a Muslim majority: Alibori (81.3%), Donga (77.9%) and Borgou (69.8%). Couffo has the lowest share of Muslims in Benin as Muslims comprise less than 1% of the total population.

Other groups
Other religious groups in Benin include Eckankar and followers of the Baháʼí Faith.

Freedom of religion

The Constitution of Benin provides for freedom of religion, and the government generally respects this right in practice. The United States government recorded no reports of societal abuses or discrimination based on religious belief or practice during 2007, and prominent societal leaders have taken positive steps to promote religious freedom.

References